Pseudaprophata is a genus of longhorn beetles of the subfamily Lamiinae, containing the following species:

 Pseudaprophata albomaculata Hüdepohl, 1995
 Pseudaprophata newmanni (Westwood, 1863)
 Pseudaprophata puncticornis (Heller, 1924)

References

Pteropliini